Molly Joan Hagan is an American actress. She co-starred in films Code of Silence (1985), Some Kind of Wonderful (1987), The Dentist (1996), Election (1999), and Sully (2016), and is also known for her roles in television on Herman's Head (1991–1994) and Unfabulous (2004–2007).

Life and career
Hagan was born in Minneapolis, Minnesota, the daughter of Mary Elizabeth (née Henslee) and John Robert Hagan. She was raised in Fort Wayne, Indiana, and attended Northwestern University.

Hagan played Diana Luna alongside Chuck Norris in the 1985 action film Code of Silence. Other films in which she appeared include Some Kind of Wonderful. She portrayed the young Miss Ellie Ewing in the television movie Dallas: The Early Years (a prequel of the long-running soap opera Dallas), and she has appeared in several other television series, including the 1980s situation comedy The Golden Girls as Caroline, the daughter of Miles Webber, Rose's romantic partner.

Hagan starred in the cult series Nutt House, which had a six-week run in 1989, and Herman's Head, which ran on Fox from 1991 to 1994. She portrayed Angel, one of the four characters inside Herman, and represented his sensitivity. She was in two episodes of the detective mystery series Columbo, "Murder, Smoke and Shadows" (1989), and "Butterfly in Shades of Grey" (1994). She also appeared twice on Murder, She Wrote (in two different roles). At the end of the second season of Star Trek: Deep Space Nine, she played a young Vorta called Eris in "The Jem'Hadar". She appeared in three episodes of the third season of Becker, and also appeared on Seinfeld as Sister Roberta, the Latvian Orthodox novice whom Kramer nearly took from the church, and a cooking teacher on Friends. She played a trailer-trash mother in a Jerry Springer-based movie, Ringmaster. She played Diane McAllister in the 1999 movie Election opposite Matthew Broderick. Hagan also played Coach Crenshaw in Air Bud: Seventh Inning Fetch.

Hagan played the mother of Emma Roberts's character Addie in the Nickelodeon series Unfabulous from 2004 to 2007. She also made a guest appearances in many television series, such as Charmed, Bones, Grey's Anatomy, Desperate Housewives, Ghost Whisperer, Cold Case, Private Practice, The Closer, and NYPD Blue. Hagan also appeared in Disney Channel Original Movie Princess Protection Program in 2009, and had another guest appearance in an episode of the Disney Channel sitcom Liv and Maddie. In 2014, Hagan was cast as the lead character's mother in The CW series, iZombie, based on the DC Comics. She later made recurring guest appearances in Jane the Virgin, The Orville, No Good Nick, and Truth Be Told. In 2017, she co-starred in the NBC limited series Law & Order True Crime, and in 2020, was cast in a series-regular role as title character`s mother in the CW crime series, Walker.

Filmography

Film

Television

References

External links
 
 

American film actresses
American television actresses
Living people
Actresses from Minneapolis
American soap opera actresses
20th-century American actresses
21st-century American actresses
Northwestern University School of Communication alumni
Year of birth missing (living people)